The 1968 Vancouver Royal Canadians season was the second season in the history of the Vancouver Royal Canadians soccer club. The club played in the North American Soccer League (NASL) at Empire Stadium in Vancouver, British Columbia.

Following the 1967 season, the USA and the FIFA-blacklisted National Professional Soccer League merged to form the North American Soccer League. The merger meant that teams from the predecessor leagues competing against each other in the same markets needed to be moved, combined, or folded.  As part of this process, George Fleharty bought the Vancouver Royal Canadians from E.G. Eakins and folded his NPSL team, the San Francisco Golden Gate Gales.  The new owner shortened the name to Vancouver Royals and chose player-coach Ferenc Puskás over future England manager Bobby Robson, the previous owner's new manager for the Vancouver Royals; he resigned when offered the demotion to assistant manager.  The 1968 Vancouver Royals' roster was put together without the preparation or advantage of importing an entire team.  A significant amount of the team was recruited by Bobby Robson including two brothers from Hong Kong playing in England. Ferenc Puskás also brought in several Europeans, a few players with connections to the Golden Gate Gaels, as well as at least two local players from local leagues. A few foreign players settled in Vancouver after their playing careers including Peter Dinsdale.
The Vancouver Royals had the third highest average attendance in the league at 6,197.  The club folded after the 1968 season as the NASL contracted from seventeen clubs to five for the 1969 NASL season. The five remaining teams were located roughly in the US Midwest with one team on the east coast.

Coaches 

 Bobby Robson
  Ferenc Puskás

Players 

 Num = Number, Pos = Position, Height in cm, Weight in kg, Apps = Appearances, G = Goals, A = Assists

Results

Standings

Results by round

Match results

See also 

Vancouver Royals
Vancouver Whitecaps

External links

References 

Vancouver Royals
Vancouver Royals
Vancouver Royal Canadians season
Vancouver Royal Canadians season
Vancouver Royals
Vancouver Royals seasons